This article presents a comparison of image viewers and image organizers which can be used for image viewing.

Functionality overview and licensing

Supported file formats

Commonly used vendor-independent formats

Camera raw formats

Supported operating systems

Basic features

Additional features

See also 
 Comparison of raster graphics editors
 Image editing
 List of Image file formats

Notes 
 iPhoto is part of iLife, which includes a DVD authoring package (iDVD), a video editor (iMovie), a music player (iTunes), a multimedia web publisher (iWeb), and an audio-sequencing program (GarageBand).
 FastPictureViewer's DirectX hardware acceleration support depends on the actual video card installed and the amount of available video memory. The commercial version also supports previewing some camera RAW formats for which a WIC-enabled codec exists. Such RAW codecs are currently available from Canon, Nikon, Olympus, Pentax, Sony and for Adobe DNG.

 Many applications on Mac OS X use either the Core Image or QuickTime APIs for image support. This enables reading and writing to a variety of formats, including JPEG, JPEG2000, Apple Icon Image format, TIFF, PNG, PDF, BMP and more.
 SView5 may also run on Linux/x86 and MacOS/x86 using Mono.

References

 
Image viewers